Alexa Curtis may refer to:

Alexa Curtis (entrepreneur) (born c. 1999), American entrepreneur, writer and former radio host
Alexa Curtis (singer) (born  2004), Australian singer, songwriter, and actress